Save Your Love for Me is an album by vocalist Etta Jones which was recorded in 1986 and released on the Muse label.

Track listing
 "Save Your Love for Me" (Buddy Johnson) – 5:00
 "The One I Love (Belongs to Somebody Else)" (Isham Jones, Gus Kahn) – 3:06
 "Georgia on My Mind" (Hoagy Carmichael, Stuart Gorrell) – 4:32
 "My Man" (Jacques Charles, Channing Pollock, Albert Willemetz, Maurice Yvain) – 3:52
 "The Man That Got Away" (Harold Arlen, Ira Gershwin) – 5:50
 "Let's Beat Out Some Love" (Johnson) – 4:49
 "Stardust" (Hoagy Carmichael, Mitchell Parish) – 4:24 
 "East of the Sun (and West of the Moon)" (Brooks Bowman) – 3:30

Personnel
Etta Jones – vocals
Houston Person – tenor saxophone
Cedar Walton  – piano
George Devens – vibraphone
George Duvivier – bass
Frankie Jones – drums

References

Muse Records albums
Etta Jones albums
Albums recorded at Van Gelder Studio
1981 albums